Sonochrome was a brand of Kodak film stock that was pre-tinted, but did not interfere with the optical soundtrack on the film.  It was introduced in 1928 and was discontinued in the 1970s.  Sonochrome stocks did not see much use in features after the 1930s, but were widely used in theater snipes (short advertisements) and special scenes in films.

Colors available

There were 17 colors in the Sonochrome spectrum: 

Rose Doree
Peachblow
Afterglow
Firelight
Candleflame
Sunshine
Verdante
Aquagreen
Turquoise
Azure
Nocturne
Purplehaze
Fleur de lis
Amaranth
Caprice
Inferno

References
 http://zauberklang.ch/filmcolors/timeline-entry/1330/

See also
Film tinting
Film colorization

Film and video technology